Gallaxy is a Ghanaian hiplife and afrobeats duo from Ashaiman made up of Randsford Ohene (stage name Bra Chiky, born 30 January 1986) and David Adjeiwoda (stage name Kwesi Dav, born 10 November 1985). They were nominated for the 'Best group' in the maiden edition of the Ghana Entertainment Awards USA together with R2Bees, Keche and VVIP.

Discography 

 Boko Boko
 My Prayer ft Kofi Kinaata
 Papabi
 Qualities
 Dab ft Ene Yatt
 Wote Ati
 Chop Money ft Guru
 Wo Do Nti
 Highlife Agogo
 Gborgborvor ft Stonebwoy

References 

Duos
Ghanaian Afrobeat musicians